Margarita 2 (also known as: Margarita 2 y la banda de los hermanos mayores) is a 2018 Peruvian comedy film directed by Frank Pérez-Garland and written by Alberto Rojas Apel & Vanessa Saba. It is a sequel to the 2016 Peruvian film Margarita. Starring Giovanni Ciccia, Francisca Aronsson, Melania Urbina, Cesar Ritter, Vanessa Saba, Maria Grazia Gamarra and Yvonne Frayssinet. The film was released on August 2, 2018.

Synopsis 
Margarita will discover that he will have one less brother and, before this, he will launch a plan during a vacation organized by his father on a northern beach.

Cast 
The actors participating in this film are:

 Francisca Aronsson as Margarita
 Giovanni Ciccia as Rafo
 Melania Urbina as Claudia
 Vanessa Saba as Sandra
 César Ritter as Charlie
 Maria Grazia Gamarra as Thalia
 Yvonne Frayssinet as Rebeca

Reception 
At the end of the year, the film attracted a total of 258,585 viewers, becoming the tenth highest-grossing Peruvian film of 2018.

References

External links 

 

2018 films
2018 comedy films
Peruvian comedy films
La Soga Producciones films
2010s Spanish-language films
2010s Peruvian films
Films set in Peru
Films shot in Peru
Films about father–daughter relationships
Films about children
Peruvian sequel films